Bernard A. (Bob) Pickell (2 July 1927 – 8 August 1986) was a Canadian basketball player. He competed in the men's tournament at the 1952 Summer Olympics and the 1956 Summer Olympics. He died of cancer in 1986.

References

1927 births
1986 deaths
Canadian men's basketball players
Olympic basketball players of Canada
Basketball players at the 1952 Summer Olympics
Basketball players at the 1956 Summer Olympics
Lithuanian emigrants to Canada
Sportspeople from Kaunas
Deaths from cancer in Ontario